Thailand participated in the 2015 Southeast Asian Games from 5 to 16 June 2015.

Competitors

Medal summary

Medal by sport

Medal by Date

Medalists

Multiple Gold Medalists
Multiple medalists with at least 2 gold medal

References

External links
 

Nations at the 2015 Southeast Asian Games
2015
Southeast Asian Games